Huia melasma is a species of frogs in the family Ranidae. It is endemic to western and northern Thailand and known from Kanchanaburi, Prachuap Kiri Khan, and Chiang Mai Provinces.

Taxonomy
Huia melasma is sometimes placed in the genus Odorrana, but actually seems to belong neither there nor in Huia, at least if the latter genus is defined in the strict sense.

Description
Males in the type series measure  in snout–vent length. No females were collected but a photographed individual presumed to be female measured  in snout–vent length.

The overall appearance of this species is moderately slender. The head is narrow with obtusely pointed snout. The tympanum is distinct. The fingers are unwebbed but have tips that are expanded to small discs; the toes are strongly webbed and have discs at their tips. Skin on the dorsum is shagreened; on the sides and venter skin is smooth. The dorsolateral fold is weak.

Habitat and conservation
The known locations are within protected areas (including Chaloem Rattanakosin National Park and Kaeng Krachan National Park), although habitat change from agriculture, fire, tourism development, and illegal logging continues to occur.

References

melasma
Frogs of Asia
Amphibians of Thailand
Endemic fauna of Thailand
Amphibians described in 2005
Taxonomy articles created by Polbot